Union is a township in Cass County, Missouri, south of Kansas City.

Geography and Demographics 
Land area: 30.1 sq. mi.
Water area: 0.1 sq. mi.
Population: 2,128 (all rural).
Males: 1,074.
Females: 1,054.
Races in Union township:
 White Non-Hispanic: 96.2%
 Black: 0.6%
 American Indian and Alaska Native: 0.9%
 Asian: 0.4%
 Two or more races: 1.0%
 Some other race: 0.0%

External links 
 Case County website
 Union Township site

Townships in Cass County, Missouri
Townships in Missouri